Wyoming Highway 72 (WYO 72) is a  Wyoming state highway in eastern-central Carbon County that travels from Elk Mountain northwest to Hanna.

Route description
Highway 72 begins its south end at Carbon County Route 402 (East Main Street) in Elk Mountain. WYO 72 heads northwest out of Elk Mountain as Bridge Street and then loses the name when it leaves the town. Highway 72 continues heading northwest towards Hanna, Wyoming, hence the road's name Hanna Road.  north of Carbon County Route 402, Highway 72 intersects U.S. Routes 30 and 287.

Highway 72 uses two inventory control numbers. ML 412 is used for the section from Hanna to US 30 while ML 404 is used for the section from US 30 to Elk Mountain. This results in an unusual situation where mileposts overlap. ML 412 starts at milepost zero at US-30 and continues through Hanna to milepost 3.02, while ML 404 starts at milepost 1.55 from US 30 and continues to milepost 15.98 in Elk Mountain. This means that there are two mileposts for every interval between 1.55 and 3.02.

Major intersections

External links

 Wyoming Routes 000-099
 WYO 72 - Hanna to US 30/US 287
 WYO 72 - US 30/US 287 to I-80
 WYO 72 - I-80 to Elk Mountain
 Carbon County, WY website
 Town of Elk Mountain, WY website
 Town of Elk Mountain, WY unofficial website
 Town of Hanna, WY website

References
 Official 2003 State Highway Map of Wyoming

Transportation in Carbon County, Wyoming
072